"Namibia, Land of the Brave" is the national anthem of Namibia, adopted in December 1991. It was written by Axali Doëseb, who was the director of a traditional music group from the Kalahari desert. Doëseb was chosen to write it after winning a contest held after Namibia became independent in 1990.

History 
Namibia's first national anthem, albeit unofficial, was "Das Südwesterlied" while under German colonization as German South-West Africa. After it became South-West Africa as a League of Nations mandate under the Union of South Africa, the national anthem was changed to "Die Stem van Suid-Afrika" to match South Africa's. Following independence, "Nkosi Sikelel' iAfrika" was provisionally adopted as a temporary national anthem pending the formal adoption of an official national anthem. It was later decided that Namibia needed a unique anthem, and a national competition was held to compose a new national anthem. The competition was won by Axali Doeseb with "Namibia, Land of the Brave". The anthem was first played in public in a ceremony on the first anniversary of Namibia's independence from South Africa in 1991. The similarity of the lyric's first-line phrase "Land of the Brave" to the end of "The Star-Spangled Banner", the national anthem of the United States, has been noted by commentators.

The composition of the Namibian national anthem was supervised by Hidipo Hamutenya, then chairman of the National Symbols subcommittee. In 2006, Hamutenya claimed that he authored the lyrics himself, "on the plane to Cuba". Doëseb denied the claim.

Legislation 
The Parliament of Namibia passed the National Anthem of the Republic of Namibia Act, 1991. This confirmed "Namibia, Land of the Brave" as the national anthem of Namibia; made it an offense to insult it, with punishment upon conviction of up to five years imprisonment or up to a 20,000-rand fine or both; and allowed the President of Namibia to create regulations relating to it.

Lyrics

References

External links
 National anthem of Namibia (MIDI)

African anthems
Namibian music
National symbols of Namibia
National anthem compositions in C major